XHRZ-FM is a radio station on 103.5 FM in Nogales, Sonora, Mexico. The station is owned by Grupo Audiorama Comunicaciones and carries its La Bestia Grupera format.

History
XHRZ received its concession on November 30, 1973. It was owned by Manuel Montoya Obregón. XHRZ was originally slated to be on 89.1 MHz.

Radiorama Leasing the station in 2012 and then leasing it to Larsa when Radiorama shed many of its stations in Sonora.

This station reverted to Radiorama control but the station is operated by Audiorama, a related company to Radiorama, until October 4, 2021, the station formally launched La Bestia Grupera 103.5 FM, a regional mexican format.

References

Radio stations in Sonora
Radio stations established in 1973